is a Japanese video game music composer, sound designer and musician. Sometimes he was referred to as Matsuri Wakasugi, or simply MIYA.

He is best known for his work on Tecmo video games such as the Captain Tsubasa series for the Super Famicom, but has also composed music for the Monster Rancher series and Deception series. Miyazaki composed about a third of Kagero: Deception II soundtrack overall (with Masaaki Udagawa (宇田川昌昭) and Ayako Toyoda (豊田亜矢子) composing the rest), and also worked on Soumatou (known in North America as Deception III: Dark Delusion).

Video games

 Bad News Baseball (1989) Nintendo Entertainment System
 Tecmo World Wrestling (1989) Nintendo Entertainment System
 Ninja Gaiden II: The Dark Sword of Chaos (1990) Nintendo Entertainment System
 Ninja Gaiden III: The Ancient Ship of Doom (1991) Nintendo Entertainment System
 Final Star Force (1992) Arcade
 Tecmo Super Bowl (1993) Super Nintendo Entertainment System, (1996) PlayStation
 Captain Tsubasa 4: Pro no Rival Tachi (1993) Super Famicom
 Captain Tsubasa 5: Hasha no Shōgō Campione (1994) Super Famicom
 Ninja Gaiden Trilogy (1995) Super Nintendo Entertainment System
 V-Goal Soccer '96 (1996) 3DO
 Kagero: Deception II (1998) PlayStation
 Tecmo World Cup '98 (1998) Arcade
 Deception III: Dark Delusion (1999) PlayStation
 Monster Rancher Hop-A-Bout (2000) PlayStation
 Super Shot Soccer sound (2002) PlayStation
 Monster Rancher 4 (2003) PlayStation 2

See also
 List of video game musicians

References
Hiroshi Miyazaki at VGMdb
Hiroshi Miyazaki at MusicBrainz
Hiroshi Miyazaki ~ 宮崎 博（みやざき ひろし） at GameMusicComposerMEMO 
Chinatsu Okayasu ~ 岡安千夏（おかやす ちなつ） at GameMusicComposerMEMO 

Year of birth missing (living people)
Japanese composers
Japanese male composers
Japanese male musicians
Living people
Video game composers